Nanyang Commercial Bank (NCB, Chinese: 南洋商業銀行) is a bank based in Hong Kong and a wholly owned subsidiary of China Cinda Asset Management (Cinda), with 42 branches. It was established in Hong Kong on 14 December 1949.  NCB primarily focuses on corporate customers, in particular trading companies.

In 2015 Cinda acquired Nanyang Commercial Bank from Bank of China (Hong Kong) for HK$68 billion. Cinda had purchased NCB to diversify its business in areas of cross-border finance.

Strategic Development
It was reported in December 2018 that Nanyang Commercial Bank was one of the shareholders of a new fintech firm Nova Credit, which had entered bid to a new Know Your Client utility platform to be implemented for banks in Hong Kong and greater bay China region.

References

External links
 Official website

Banks of Hong Kong
Bank of China
Banks established in 1949
1949 establishments in Hong Kong